Mrs. America is an American historical drama television miniseries produced by FX and originally aired on the sister streaming service FX on Hulu. Created and co-written by Davhi Waller and directed by Anna Boden and Ryan Fleck, Amma Asante, Laure de Clermont-Tonnerre, and Janicza Bravo, the series details the unsuccessful political movement to pass the Equal Rights Amendment and the unexpected backlash led by conservative activist Phyllis Schlafly in the 1970s. It features a large ensemble cast led by Cate Blanchett, Rose Byrne, Uzo Aduba, Elizabeth Banks, Margo Martindale, John Slattery, Tracey Ullman, and Sarah Paulson.

The nine-part series premiered in the United States on April 15, 2020 to widespread critical acclaim. At the 72nd Primetime Emmy Awards, it received ten nominations including Outstanding Limited Series and Outstanding Writing, as well as acting nominations for Blanchett, Aduba, Martindale, and Ullman, with Aduba winning Outstanding Supporting Actress in a Limited Series or Movie. In January 2021, the American Film Institute named Mrs. America as one of the ten best television shows of 2020.

Premise
Mrs. America is based on and dramatizes the story of the movement to ratify the Equal Rights Amendment, and the unexpected backlash led by conservative activist Phyllis Schlafly, played by Blanchett. Through the eyes of the women of that era – both Schlafly and prominent second-wave feminists including Gloria Steinem, Betty Friedan, Shirley Chisholm, Bella Abzug, and Jill Ruckelshaus – the series explores how one of the toughest battlegrounds in the culture wars of the 1970s helped give rise to the Moral Majority and permanently shifted the American political landscape.

Every episode contains an opening message which acknowledges that some scenes and characters are fictionalized for creative purposes.

Cast and characters

Main

 Cate Blanchett as Phyllis Schlafly, a prominent conservative activist, lawyer and political lobbyist who founded the "STOP ERA" campaign (later the Eagle Forum).
 Rose Byrne as Gloria Steinem, a prominent feminist, journalist, and social political activist who co-founded the National Women's Political Caucus and Ms. magazine.
 Uzo Aduba as Shirley Chisholm, a politician, educator, and author who was the first black candidate for a major party's nomination for President of the United States, and one of the first two women to run for the Democratic Party's nomination.
 Elizabeth Banks as Jill Ruckelshaus, a Republican feminist activist, co-founder of the National Organization for Women (NOW) and the National Women's Political Caucus, and head of the White House Office of Women's Programs.
 Kayli Carter as Pamela, a fictional composite character; a young housewife and member of Schlafly's "STOP ERA" campaign.
 Ari Graynor as Brenda Feigen, a feminist activist and attorney, the National Legislative Vice President of NOW.
 Melanie Lynskey as Rosemary Thomson, a conservative activist, member of the "STOP ERA" campaign and the head of Schlafly's Eagle Foundation.
 Margo Martindale as Bella Abzug, a US congresswoman and prominent feminist activist, co-founder of NOW and the National Women's Political Caucus, and leader of President Carter’s National Advisory Commission for Women.
 John Slattery as Fred Schlafly, the husband of Phyllis; a wealthy lawyer, conservative activist, and ardent anti-communist.
 Jeanne Tripplehorn as Eleanor Schlafly, the sister-in-law of Phyllis; a conservative activist, and ally of the "STOP ERA" campaign.
 Tracey Ullman as Betty Friedan, a prominent feminist activist, author of The Feminine Mystique, and co-founder of NOW and the National Women's Political Caucus.
 Sarah Paulson as Alice Macray, a fictional composite character intended to represent the conservative women that followed Schlafly's "STOP ERA" campaign; a housewife and friend of Phyllis.

Recurring
 Niecy Nash as Flo Kennedy, a lawyer, feminist, and civil rights advocate who co-founded the National Women's Political Caucus.
 Bria Henderson as Margaret Sloan-Hunter, a feminist and civil rights advocate, and editor of Ms. magazine.
 Annie Parisse as Midge Costanza, a social and feminist activist, and Presidential advisor to President Carter.
 Anna Douglas as Jean O'Leary, a feminist and gay rights activist, with whom Midge is in a closeted relationship.
 Melissa Joyner as Audrey Rowe Colom, a feminist and civil rights activist, and Chairperson of the National Women's Political Caucus.
 Andrea Navedo as Carmen Delgado Votaw, a civil rights activist, and co-chair of the National Advisory Committee on Women.
 Jay Ellis as Franklin Thomas, an attorney and businessman who has a romantic relationship with Gloria Steinem.
 David Eisner as Martin Abzug, the husband of Bella Abzug.
 John Bourgeois as George McGovern, a U.S. senator, and the Democratic Party presidential nominee in the 1972 presidential election.
 James Marsden as Phil Crane, a Republican politician, U.S. congressman, and ally of the "STOP ERA" campaign.
 Jake Lacy as John Stanley Pottinger, a politician, and Assistant United States Attorney General for the Civil Rights Division.
 Cindy Drummond as Lottie Beth Hobbs, an Evangelical conservative activist and author, and member of "STOP ERA" and Eagle Forum.
 Teresa Pavlinek as Ann Patterson, a conservative housewife and member of the "STOP ERA" campaign.
 Melinda Page Hamilton as Mary Frances, a conservative housewife and president of the Louisiana chapter of the "STOP ERA" campaign.
 Ben Rosenfield as John Schlafly, the eldest child and son of Phyllis and Fred Schlafly, a closeted homosexual.
 Brendan Cox as Bruce Schlafly, the second child of Phyllis and Fred Schlafly.
 Olivia Scriven as Phyl ‘Liza’ Schlafly, the eldest daughter of Phyllis and Fred Schlafly.
 Lucy Margey plays Phyl as a child
 Marcia Bennett as Odile Stewart, the mother of Phyllis Schlafly.
 Novie Edwards as Willie B. Reed, the housekeeper for the Schlafly family.

Guest
 Norm Lewis as Ron Dellums, a U.S. congressman and friend of Shirley Chisholm.
 Adam Brody as Marc Fasteau, a lawyer, activist, the husband of Brenda Feigen, and the author of The Male Machine.
 Bobby Cannavale as Tom Snyder, a television personality, and the host of The Tomorrow Show.
 Josh Hamilton as William Ruckelshaus, a Republican politician and the husband of Jill Ruckelshaus.
 Tara Nicodemo as Ruth Bader Ginsburg, a prominent lawyer, and co-founder of the Women's Rights Law Reporter and the ACLU Women's Rights Project.
 Roberta Colindrez as Jules, a photographer who has an adulterous relationship with Brenda Feigen.
 Miriam Shor as Natalie Gittelson, an editor for Harper's Bazaar magazine and the best friend of Betty Friedan.
 Julie White as an ERA supporter that Alice meets at the bar of the 1977 National Women's Conference.
 Dan Beirne as Hamilton Jordan, a politician and Chief of Staff to President Carter.
 Hannah Galway as Elizabeth Ray, a congressional secretary who is sexually abused by her boss

Episodes

Production

Development
Mrs. America was created and co-written by Emmy Award winning Canadian writer Dahvi Waller, who previously had writing credits on acclaimed television shows such as Mad Men and Halt and Catch Fire. The head of FX, John Landgraf, had become interested in the reappraisal of historical events "embedded in America’s collective consciousness" after Ryan Murphy originally sketched out the plot of American Crime Story. Landgraf saw Mrs. America and its portrayal of the battle surrounding the Equal Rights Amendment as having a "direct bearing on the political climate in which we find ourselves today." He also commented that, "It's a wonderful thing when any creator, any broadcaster can sort of find that place where it’s not homework to watch something, yet it has an enormous amount of artistic or educational value."

Waller said that, while researching and developing the series, she realized that (in relation to equal rights) the U.S. had not progressed as much in the last 50 years as she initially thought. She commented that Mrs. America serves "as an origin story of today’s culture wars — you can draw a direct line from 1970 to today through Phyllis Schlafly and really understand how we became such a divided nation." Cate Blanchett, who served as an executive producer on the series as well as starring as Schlafly, also echoed the sentiment and the timeliness of the series, saying, "In the process of developing it — like with Roe v. Wade — there were questions with 'Is this really relevant, do we really need a whole episode about this?' It seemed that every passing day in the development process and certainly during shooting, right up to Virginia debating the ERA right now, it became like Groundhog Day; the literal discussions that we were having during 1971, 1972 going through the series were constantly popping up in the media."

Waller also desired to highlight the beginnings of intersectional feminism within the series through the character of Shirley Chisholm, played by Uzo Aduba. Chisholm was the first black female candidate in history to run for the U.S. presidency. Waller commented, "One of the great things about this period is you have the birth of a lot of things, including intersectional feminism and LGBTQ rights. In episode 3, Shirley is really the beginning of the birth of intersectional feminism, and it's a messy beginning. I think the women's movement was really growing in this time period and learning lessons."

On October 30, 2018, it was announced that FX had given the show a series order. The nine-episode miniseries was written by Dahvi Waller, Tanya Barfield, Boo Killebrew, Micah Schraft, April Shih, Sharon Hoffman, and Joshua Allen Griffith and directed by Anna Boden and Ryan Fleck, Amma Asante, Laure de Clermont-Tonnerre, and Janicza Bravo. Waller also served as an executive producer alongside Stacey Sher, Cate Blanchett, Ryan Fleck, Anna Boden, and Coco Francini.

The first official images of the series were released on August 6, 2019. In November 2019, it was announced the show would premiere on Hulu instead of FX, as part of "FX on Hulu". In January 2020, it was announced that the series would premiere on April 15, 2020.

Casting
Alongside the series order, Cate Blanchett was announced to star. In May 2019, Uzo Aduba, Rose Byrne, Kayli Carter, Ari Graynor, Melanie Lynskey, James Marsden, Margo Martindale, Sarah Paulson, John Slattery, Jeanne Tripplehorn and Tracey Ullman were added to the series. In June 2019, Elizabeth Banks was cast to star while Bria Henderson was set to recur. Niecy Nash was cast in a recurring role in August, with Olivia Scriven cast in October.

Filming
Principal photography for the series took place from June 19 to November 1, 2019, in Toronto, Ontario.

Music 
The musical score was composed by American composer Kris Bowers. The opening theme, "A Fifth of Beethoven", was chosen by the show's music supervisor, Mary Ramos, because "It represents both sides of the story. Phyllis and her conservative friends listen to classical music most of the time, so it’s that, combined with the sexiness and freedom of the feminists, all epitomized in one song — the disco version of Beethoven’s Fifth."

The series also prominently features many hit songs from the 1970s, including tracks by Donna Summer, Golden Earring, Burt Bacharach, The Kinks, Linda Ronstadt, and The Runaways.

Release 
In the United States, the first three episodes premiered on Hulu under the FX on Hulu label on April 15, 2020. In India, the series started streaming on Hulu and FX's corporate sibling Disney+ Hotstar on April 16, 2020. In Australia, the series debuted on April 21, 2020 on Foxtel's Fox Showcase network, and was available on demand via its Foxtel Now and Binge services. However, as Disney now fully owned the FX titles following their output deals with Foxtel has expired, the series has been pulled out of both Foxtel and Binge and has relocated to Disney+ via Star content hub. In the United Kingdom, the series aired on BBC Two and was available for streaming on BBC iPlayer beginning on July 8, 2020.

Reception

Audience viewership 
According to Whip Media's TV Time, Mrs. America was the 2nd most anticipated new television series of April 2020. In January 2021, it was reported that Mrs. America was one of FX on Hulu’s most-watched series to date, surpassed by A Teacher.

Critical response 

Mrs. America received widespread critical acclaim. On Rotten Tomatoes, the miniseries holds an approval rating of 96% based on 96 reviews, with an average rating of 8.29/10. The website's critical consensus states: "Mrs. America captures the complicated life and times of Phyllis Schlafly with poise and style to spare, brought to vivid life by a superb ensemble led by another masterful performance from Cate Blanchett." On Metacritic, it has a weighted average score of 87 out of 100 based on 41 reviews, indicating "universal acclaim".

James Poniewozik, writing for The New York Times, praised the series, calling it "breathtaking" and "a meticulously created and observed mural that finds the germ of contemporary America in the striving of righteously mad women." Poniewozik also praised the performances of the cast, singling out Cate Blanchett ("Her final scene, wordless and devastating, might as well end with Blanchett being handed an Emmy onscreen"), Tracey Ullman ("Ullman is tsunamic as Friedan, the outspoken Feminine Mystique author now raging for relevance in the current wave of feminism"), and Margo Martindale ("a tornado in a hat, a piquantly funny force of personality").

Judy Berman, writing for Time, reviewed the series positively, writing "Creator Dahvi Waller, whose history as a writer for Mad Men and Halt and Catch Fire is evident in Mrs. Americas vivid, complex depiction of our country's recent past". Berman also praised the show's writers, stating "This degree of moral, political and philosophical complexity is what differentiates Mrs. America from so many other recent dramatizations of women’s movements past".

Inkoo Kang, writing for The Hollywood Reporter, called the series "a tremendously executed balancing act" and stated that "there's no denying that Mrs. America makes history come alive, in thoughtful and achingly real detail", whilst also praising the performances of the central cast.

Criticism
The series was criticized by Gloria Steinem and Eleanor Smeal who called it ridiculous and described it as lacking in historical accuracy. They argued the series portrayed the fight for the ERA as a catfight between women instead of showing that lobbyists protecting the financial interests of insurance and other companies affected by the change were far more influential in preventing the law from being passed. They believe this affects women's ability to believe they can effect change. Steinem and Smeal's comments were later disagreed with by fellow second-wave feminist Brenda Feigen, who called the series "extraordinary" and stated that, in her view, the nuance of the characters were portrayed very accurately. The show was also accused of being one-sided and inventing details to present Schlafly in an unsympathetic light.

Awards and nominations

References

External links
  on FX
  on Hulu
 

2020s American drama television miniseries
2020s American LGBT-related drama television series
2020s American political television series
2020 American television series debuts
2020 American television series endings
American biographical series
American political drama television series
English-language television shows
FX on Hulu original programming
Historical television series
Television series based on actual events
Television series set in the 1970s
Television series set in the 1980s